is a railway station operated by the Isumi Railway Company's Isumi Line, located in Isumi, Chiba Prefecture Japan. It is 18.2 kilometers from the eastern terminus of the Izumi Line at Ōhara Station.

History
Koyamatsu Station opened on June 20, 1960 as a station on the Japanese National Railways (JNR). With the division and privatization of the Japan National Railways on April 1, 1987, the station was acquired by the East Japan Railway Company. On March 24, 1988, the Kihara Line became the Isumi Railroad Isumi Line.

Lines
Isumi Railway Company
Isumi Line

Station layout
Koyamatsu Station has a simple side platform serving bidirectional traffic, with a three-sided rain shelter built onto the platform. The station is unstaffed.

Platforms

Surroundings
National Highway Route 465

Adjacent stations

External links
  Isumi Railway Company home page

Railway stations in Japan opened in 1960
Railway stations in Chiba Prefecture